Papuri may refer to:

Papuri Island, an island of the Gambier Islands of French Polynesia.
Papurí River in South America.
Papuri dance a traditional dance in the greater Armenia region.